Vitamin D3 24-hydroxylase (CYP24A1) is an enzyme with systematic name calcitriol,NADPH:oxygen oxidoreductase (24-hydroxylating). This enzyme catalyses the following chemical reaction

 (1) calcitriol + NADPH + H+ + O2  calcitetrol + NADP+ + H2O
 (2) calcidiol + NADPH + H+ + O2  secalciferol + NADP+ + H2O

Vitamin D3 24-hydroxylase is a heme-thiolate enzyme (P-450).

References

External links 
 

EC 1.14.13